Simon Ingersoll (March 3, 1818 – July 24, 1894) was an American  inventor who created the steam-powered percussion rock drill, which replaced the hand drill and was a major advancement in the mining and construction industries. The drill vastly increased efficiency. However, despite lower labor costs, there was no recorded upturn in unemployment. Instead, workers were assigned to more meaningful tasks.

Ingersoll was born in Stanwich, Connecticut. He was a farmer, and in his spare time an inventor. Based on his percussion drill, in 1871 he founded the Ingersoll Rock Drill Company, a predecessor of today's Ingersoll Rand. Simon Ingersoll later sold his patents and died destitute in 1894.

References

External links 
 Bio at National Inventors Hall of Fame

1818 births
1894 deaths
19th-century American inventors
Ingersoll Rand people
19th-century American businesspeople